Kevin Mock is an American television director, editor, and producer.

He is well known for his work on The WB/CWs America's Next Top Model.

Career
Mock got his start as a production assistant on Art Camachos The Power Within in 1995. He first worked in editing on the Anna Nicole Smith starrer To the Limit, as an assistant. His first edited feature was 1996s Tiger Heart, directed by George Chamchoum. He then went on to join television with TNTs L.A. Heat. He served as associate producer, and eventually co-producer, and editor until the series' conclusion in 1999.

In 2003, he joined the crew of Tyra Banks reality competition series America's Next Top Model. Mock would go on to serve in the capacities of creative consultant, editor, co-producer and segment director. He was an integral part of the show until his departure after the 13th cycle. He ultimately edited 24 episodes and co-produced 94.

He has edited for such series as Stylista, Breaking In, Cult, Forever and Teen Wolf. In recent years, he has segued to directing and helming three episodes of The CW's Hart of Dixie. Mock has only edited and directed two series in his career, the first being NBCs spy comedy Chuck, and the second being The CW's superhero team-up series DC's Legends of Tomorrow. Both series are showrunned/executive produced by Phil Klemmer and Chris Fedak, who brought Mock on board.

References

External links

American film directors
American television directors
American television producers
Living people
Place of birth missing (living people)
Year of birth missing (living people)